Walid Nabhan (born 1966) is a Maltese writer and translator of Palestinian-Jordanian origin. He was born in Amman, Jordan to a family of refugees who had fled from their village home near Hebron, Palestine during the 1948 Palestinian exodus. He arrived in Malta in 1990 as a science student. He studied biomedical sciences at Bristol University, and went on to obtain a master's degree in human rights from the University of Malta.

Nabhan has published two books of short stories in Maltese, and one novel titled L-Eżodu taċ-Ċikonji (2013) which won the Maltese National Prize for Literature in 2014, and the EU Prize for Literature in 2017. He published a collection of poetry in Maltese in 2014. Nabhan has also translated works of Maltese literature into Arabic.

On 24 January Walid Nabhan has stated that the prayers being organized by the Malta Muslim Council, led by Bader Zina, are a form of Islamic fundamentalism. He said that the building of another mosque is unnecessarily and that this would officiate the "split" between the Muslim community of the Mariam Al-Batool Mosque and the Muslim community of the Malta Muslim Council. He also discredited the need of other Muslim places of worship. He further observed that Bader Zeina himself, on Times Talk television program (on TVM (Malta)), has gone as far as silencing a Maltese woman (who converted to Islam) namely Simone Zammit Endrich who spoke of Islamic facts (religious practice and norms) rather than political Islam.

Walid Nabham is an integral well established writer in Malta and has written several literature material, including books about Islam and Arab culture, and has taken stands several times against religious fundamentalism. Following Nabham's remarks both him and Mr Zeina were invited on Disett, a talkshow on TVM; were Zeina did not turn up, and when Nabham went back to his car after the talkshow he found his car vandalized which was interpreted as a form of a threat or warning.

References

Maltese male novelists
20th-century Maltese novelists
21st-century Maltese novelists
1966 births
Living people
Maltese-language writers